Jacob Tomuri (born 4 December 1979) is a New Zealand actor and stunt man.  In 2000–2001 he appeared in over 50 twice-weekly episodes of the UK/NZ teen sci-fi series The Tribe as Lt. Luke.  In 2001 he did stunt work for all three of The Lord of the Rings film trilogy.

He has had guest roles in the long running TV New Zealand soap Shortland Street (2004–2005), Revelations – The Initial Journey (2003), and the syndicated-by-ABC series Legend of the Seeker (2008) for which he has also done regular stunt work. He has had minor roles in the 2001 New Zealand film Snakeskin, as pirate Bill Jukes in Peter Pan (2003), and Columbia Pictures horror film 30 Days of Night, and a central role in the short Ergotism.  He had a bit part in the blockbuster Avatar, for which he also did stunts.  His stunt work include Starz's TV series Spartacus: Blood and Sand (2010). In 2013 he began work as a stunt double for Tom Hardy, in films including Mad Max: Fury Road, Legend, The Revenant, and Venom.

Personal life 
Jacob Tomuri has 4 siblings. He failed drama in high school, though he loved it and could not think of doing anything but acting.
After completing his secondary school education, Jacob started working and learning at The New Zealand College of Performing Arts in Porirua. 
When he graduated, he got a job in The Lord of the Rings as a stuntman. First only a contract for 4 weeks, it became a year-and-a-half contract. Jacob was the youngest member of the 20-strong stunt team.  He learned a lot about stuntworking, while working on The Lord of the Rings Trilogy. While working as a stuntman, he also had a role as Lieutenant Luke in the third series of The Tribe and a small role in the movie Snakeskin. In 2004, he got the award as CLEO Celebrity Bachelor of the Year 2004.
Jacob is engaged and a father of 2 Sons.

Filmography

References

External links

A PDF Biography by Johnsonlaird

1979 births
Living people
New Zealand male television actors
New Zealand stunt performers
New Zealand male soap opera actors
20th-century New Zealand male actors
21st-century New Zealand male actors